Neolamarckia is a genus with one or two species of trees native to the Old World tropics. It has often been confused with other genera, particularly Nauclea and Neonauclea to such an extent that descriptions of Neolamarckia may state incorrectly that its fruit is a capsule.

Description

The inflorescenes are spherical, containing many small flowers. The fruit is a drupe that sometimes separates into four sections.

Species
 Neolamarckia cadamba, native to east Asia, south Asia, and southeast Asia
 Neolamarckia macrophylla, native to south Asia, and southeast Asia

Botanical nomenclature
The genus name was created to replace Anthocephalus, which had been based on two unrelated herbarium specimens, one of which was mislabelled. Consequently, the true Anthocephalus is a synonym of the genus Breonia, and a new name was needed for the trees that had been generally known by the incorrect name.

References

Naucleeae
Trees of China
Trees of the Indian subcontinent
Rubiaceae genera